"Ma dope" is a song by French hip hop artist Nekfeu featuring fellow French hip hop artist S.Pri Noir. It is the twelfth track from Nekfeu's debut studio album Feu and is produced by himself and DJ Elite.

The song was not officially released as a single, but nevertheless entered the French Singles Chart at number 125 on 20 June 2015, peaking at number 74. A music video for the song was released on YouTube on 8 September 2015.

Track listing
 Digital download
 "Ma dope (featuring S.Pri Noir)" – 3:47

Chart performance

References

2015 songs
Nekfeu songs
French hip hop songs
Songs written by Nekfeu